Jameh Mosque of Ahar is related to the Ilkhanate - Safavid dynasty and is located in Ahar.

References

National works of Iran
Mosques in East Azerbaijan Province
Mosque buildings with domes
Ahar